Almondsbury is a large village near junction 16 of the M5 motorway, in South Gloucestershire, England, and a civil parish which also includes the villages of Hortham, Gaunt's Earthcott, Over, Easter Compton, Compton Greenfield, Hallen and Berwick.

Governance
Almondsbury is in the South Gloucestershire unitary authority area. The electoral ward of Almondsbury covers the same area as the civil parish, stretching from Gaunt's Earthcott east of the M5 motorway south-west to Hallen on the boundary with Bristol.

Description

The village is split by a steep hill, part of the escarpment overlooking the Severn floodplain. At the bottom of the hill is Lower Almondsbury where a pub and hotel, The Bowl Inn, is situated. South Wales, the Forest of Dean, the River Severn and both Severn Bridges are visible from the higher parts of the village. The other part of the village consists mainly of ribbon development along the A38, which has more of an urban characteristic.

The place-name 'Almondsbury' is first attested in the Domesday Book of 1086, where it appears as Almodesberie. The name means 'Æthelmod's or Ealhmund's burgh or fortified place'.

The pub takes its name from the bowl shape of the land surrounding the estuary. Parts of this whitewashed-stone inn were originally the three cottages erected in 1146 to house the monks building the adjacent church of St Mary the Virgin. The present building became a licensed inn in 1550.

Also at the bottom of the hill is the local church, dedicated to Saint Mary the Virgin.

The church and tower were built in 1140 AD. The lead-covered spire was added some time before 1619.

In 1817, a woman purporting to be Princess Caraboo was found in the town, in what was to become one of the more elaborate deceptions of the period.

Amenities
Another pub, The Swan Inn, is located on the A38, in the upper part of the village, almost opposite an open space known as Almondsbury Tump.

In March 2009 a community shop was opened in the village by the not-for-profit Almondsbury Community Services Association, situated opposite the Old School Hall at 14 Church Road. The community shop is staffed entirely by unpaid volunteers. The aim of the project goes beyond a village shop, being a service for the village, to support local suppliers wherever possible, and to be another focal point where people in the village can meet. A proportion of the surplus generated by the shop is returned to community projects and organisations in the village. In 2018, the village community purchased the premises from the church through a Community Share issue. The chairman of the shop committee is John Mclevy.

The village also has an ambulance station, a motorway police station, a garden centre, and a restaurant/pub. A helicopter base is currently in development next to the Almondsbury Interchange as a new home for National Police Air Service Filton and the Great Western Air Ambulance.

Sport and leisure

Almondsbury is home to non-League football club Almondsbury F.C. who play at Almondsbury Sports & Social Complex on Gloucester Road. Almondbury Cricket Club and Almondsbury Tennis club are also based at the same site.

Gloucestershire FA are also based in Almondsbury at Oakland Park. North Bristol RFC play next door.

Almondsbury is home to St Nick's Gaelic Athletic Association club.

Education
Education is provided by Almondsbury Church of England Primary School. This is a state maintained school. The Ofsted report, dated April 2009, rated the school as good (outstanding in places). For secondary education, Almondsbury is served by Patchway Community School.

Notable residents

 Cattelena (died 1625), an African woman, kept a small dairy business in Almondsbury during the early 17th century.
 Alex Kapranos (born 1972), the lead singer of Franz Ferdinand.
 Reginald Crompton (1870–1945), stage and silent film actor.

Civil parish 
The civil parish of Almondsbury is much larger than the village.  It includes the villages of Hortham, Gaunt's Earthcott, Over, Easter Compton, Compton Greenfield, Catbrain and Hallen.  It also includes Cribbs Causeway and the site of the village of Charlton, now the western end of Filton Airfield.

When it was originally created in 1866 the civil parish also included Patchway, but not Easter Compton, Compton Greenfield, Hallen, Cribbs Causeway or Charlton, all of which were transferred from the parish of Henbury in 1935.  The parish of Patchway was separated from Almondsbury in 1953.

Notes and references

External links 

Almondsbury Parish Council website
 

Villages in South Gloucestershire District
Civil parishes in Gloucestershire